Bromocyclohexane (also called cyclohexyl bromide, abbreviated CXB) is an organic compound with the chemical formula C6H11Br.

It is used to match the refractive index of PMMA for example in confocal microscopy of colloids. A mixture of cis-decalin and CXB can simultaneously match optical index and density of PMMA. Due to the moderate dielectric constant of CXB (ε = 7.9 ), PMMA acquires charges that can be screened by the addition of salt (e.g. tetrabutyl ammonium bromide), leading to a very good approximation of colloidal hard sphere. A drawback is that CXB is a good solvent for PMMA, causing it to swell over time, which may lead to a poor determination of particle radii and determination of solid volume fraction.

Synthesis 
Bromocyclohexane can be prepared by the free radical substitution of bromine to the cyclohexane ring at high temperatures or in presence of UV light. The reaction is unselective, giving a mixture of polybrominated products. In principle, another synthesis involves addition of hydrogen bromide (HBr) to cyclohexene.

References

External links 
 

Organobromides